Kalyana Lakshmi Scheme or కళ్యాణ లక్ష్మిపధకం and Shaadi Mubarak is a welfare scheme for providing financial assistance for marriages by the Government of Telangana, a novel scheme for all poor people in the state. The scheme gives an assistance of ₹1,00,116, and is aimed at preventing child marriages and support marriage expense for financially distressed families. By March 2018, the beneficiaries stood at 3,90,000.

History
The scheme was launched by the Government of Telangana on 2 October 2014 by Kalvakuntla Chandrashekar Rao, the Chief Minister of Telangana, providing Rs51,000 to families from scheduled castes and tribes and later to all poor families in the state.

The scheme
The financial assistance was increased to ₹1,00,116 on 19 March 2018 from ₹75,116. It is provided to the bride's family at the time of marriage to meet the marriage expenses. The budget allocated,  ₹1450 crores, for the year 2018–19. Under Kalyana Lakshmi Scheme the budget allocated ₹1350 crores for the year 2020-21.

Eligibility
A Telangana resident girl, over 18 years of age, belonging to any community with a combined annual income of her parents not exceeding ₹2 lakh is eligible for the Scheme.

Shaadi Mubarak
A scheme also covers Muslims girls from poor families called as "Shaadi Mubarak".

Application Process 
The government has arranged for financial assistance 10 days before the wedding. One can apply for the scheme "Shaadi Mubarak or Kalyna Lakshmi" Scheme online or through Mee Seva.

See also
 Telangana Language Day
 List of Telangana poets
 Telugu New Year
 Telangana Ku Haritha Hāram

References

External links
 Official site

Government schemes in Telangana
KCR Government initiatives